Eulma is a town in north-eastern Algeria.

References

Communes of Annaba Province